Antinomasy  may refer to:

Antonomasia, a substitution of any epithet  or phrase for a proper name
Antinomianism, a belief originating in Christian theology that faith alone is necessary for salvation